Yaniella soli is a Gram-negative, slightly halophilic non-spore-forming, facultatively alkaliphilic and non-motile bacterium from the genus Yaniella which has been isolated from forest soil from Hunan Province, China.

References

External links
Type strain of Yaniella soli at BacDive -  the Bacterial Diversity Metadatabase

Micrococcaceae
Bacteria described in 2012